The  Los Angeles Rams season was the team's 32nd year with the National Football League and the 24th season in Los Angeles. The Rams were coached by fifth-year coach George Allen. This season saw the Rams attempting to improve on their 10-3-1 record from 1968, in which they barely missed the playoffs by a game. The Rams improved on that record by a mere game, finishing 11-3 and winning the Coastal Division and qualifying for the playoffs. However, in their first playoff game, they lost to the Minnesota Vikings 23–20 in the conference playoff game.

Two members of the Rams' coaching staff would later be inducted in the Pro Football Hall of Fame, head coach George Allen and special teams coach Dick Vermeil; Vermeil later would win Super Bowl XXXIV with the Rams and was also the head coach of the Philadelphia Eagles and Kansas City Chiefs.

Offseason

NFL Draft

Roster

Regular season
In 1969, the Rams opened the season with an 11-game winning streak, still a team record, before losing 4 straight at the end of the year. Roman Gabriel threw 24 touchdowns and only 7 interceptions and was named the NFL's Most Valuable Player by the AP and NEA and the Player of the Year by the UPI and he was voted All-Pro and to the Pro Bowl.
The Los Angeles Rams would not start a season 8-0 again for nearly 50 years, with their next 8-0 start (whether it be in Los Angeles or St. Louis as the St. Louis Rams) coming during the 2018 Los Angeles Rams season.

Summary
In 1967 and 1968, the Rams and Colts waged season long battles for the Coastal Division title, with the Rams winning on the season's final day in 1967 and the Colts clinching on the next to last week of the season in 1968. 1969 was expected to be no different, thus the opening game in Baltimore vs. the Colts would be a big one. The Colts were coming off a 13–1 season in 1968, but had been upset in Super Bowl III by the New York Jets.

In the opener in Baltimore, the Rams, aided by four Colts' turnovers, came back from a 20–17 deficit to win 27–20 and immediately get the upper hand in the division race. Week after week, the Rams continued to win, although they got a scare in a 27–21 week 4 win in San Francisco and a 9–7 week 6 win in Chicago vs. the Bears. After 8 weeks the Rams were 8–0–0. Meanwhile, the Colts, affected by age and injuries, were 5–3, including a 52–14 loss in week 2 vs. Minnesota. 
In week 9, the Rams survived a comeback attempt by the Eagles in a 23–17 win, while the Colts lost for the 2nd time in the season to the San Francisco 49ers (who won only 4 games all year).

Week 10 featured a showdown between the 9–0 Rams and the 8–1 Dallas Cowboys. The Rams won a thriller 24–23, aided in part by a Bob Hayes fumble while he was running untouched in the clear and seemingly headed for a touchdown (the Cowboys recovered but had to settle for a field goal). The following week the Rams clinched the division title with a 24–13 win in Washington vs. the Redskins. With 3 games left, the Rams were 11–0 and the Colts were 7–4. 
Week 12 was another showdown, this time between the 11–0 Rams and the 10–1 Vikings, who had lost their opener and then won 10 straight (and, like the Rams, already had clinched their division). The Rams dream of an undefeated season was dashed in a 20–13 loss to Minnesota, in a game that was not as close as the score indicated.  Coach George Allen decided to rest a lot of his older veterans in weeks 13 and 14 (back then home field advantage in the playoffs was rotated and not determined by best record, so the Rams knew they would open the playoffs in Minnesota regardless of their record) and the Rams lost in a Detroit snowstorm to the Lions, 28–0, and then they dropped a 13–7 game to the Colts in the final game.

Playoffs
The Rams ventured into a cold weather venue (Bloomington, Minnesota) just as they had in 1967 when they dropped a 28–7 game to the Packers in Milwaukee. This time they faced the 12–2 Vikings who had beaten the Rams in L.A. in week 12. But the Rams started off well and led 17–7 at halftime. However, they were stopped inside the 5-yard line and had to settle for a field goal; otherwise the lead would have been 21–7. The Vikings cut the lead to 17–14 but the Rams mounted a responding drive of their own but again were stopped inside the 5-yard line and had to settle for a field goal to lead 20–14. Led by the passing and running of Joe Kapp, the Vikings took the lead 21–20, and then sacked Gabriel in the end zone for a safety and a 23–20 lead late in the 4th quarter. The Rams forced a Viking punt and began to March down field in the final minute when Gabriel was intercepted near midfield, ensuring the Vikings win.

Schedule

Playoffs

Standings

Season summary

Week 1 at Colts

Awards and records
Roman Gabriel, NFL MVP
 Roman Gabriel, Bert Bell Award

Pro Bowl Honorees
 Roman Gabriel, Quarterback
 Deacon Jones, Defensive End
 Merlin Olsen, Defensive Tackle
 Charley Cowan, Offensive Tackle
 Tom Mack, Offensive Guard
 Bob Brown, Offensive Tackle
 Maxie Baughan, Linebacker
 Ed Meador, Safety

References

Los Angeles Rams
Los Angeles Rams seasons
Los Angeles Rams